Otter Mountain is a prominent  glaciated summit located in the Coast Mountains of British Columbia, Canada. Otter ranks as the 23rd most topographically prominent summit of Canada. This mountain's toponym was adopted as "Mount Otter" on 24 July 1945, and officially renamed Otter Mountain on 5 November 1953 by the Geographical Names Board of Canada. Precipitation runoff from the mountain drains west into Bitter Creek which is a tributary of the Bear River, or east to Nelson Creek which is part of the Nass River drainage basin, and all ultimately finds its way to the Inside Passage.

Climate

Based on the Köppen climate classification, Otter Mountain is located in a subarctic climate zone of western North America. Most weather fronts originate in the Pacific Ocean, and travel east toward the Coast Mountains where they are forced upward by the range (Orographic lift), causing them to drop their moisture in the form of rain or snowfall. As a result, the Coast Mountains experience high precipitation, especially during the winter months in the form of snowfall. Temperatures can drop below −20 °C with wind chill factors below −30 °C. This climate supports several glaciers on Otter Mountain's western flank, the Bear River Glacier on the north aspect, and the Cambria Icefield to the east and south.

See also

 List of the most prominent summits of Canada

Gallery

References 

Two-thousanders of British Columbia
Pacific Ranges
Stewart Country
Boundary Ranges